John Bryan Grimes (1868–1923) was a North Carolina Democratic politician and farmer who served as North Carolina Secretary of State from 1901 until his death in 1923.

He was the son of Confederate Major General Bryan Grimes and the grandson of Congressman John Heritage Bryan.

Grimes grew up on the family plantation, "Grimesland," in Pitt County. He was educated at several North Carolina private schools, and then at the University of North Carolina at Chapel Hill (1882–1885) before completing his education at Bryant and Stratton Business College in Baltimore. He worked on the staff of Governor Elias Carr. Grimes served as president of the North Carolina Tobacco Growers Association, was a member of the North Carolina Farmers Alliance, and in 1899 was appointed to the North Carolina Board of Agriculture. While serving as secretary of state, Grimes also served on and chaired the North Carolina Historical Commission.

References

North Carolina Manual of 1913
UNC: John Bryan Grimes (1868-1923) and Grimes Residence Hall
Guide to the J. Bryan Grimes Papers
OurCampaigns.com

1868 births
1923 deaths
Secretaries of State of North Carolina
North Carolina Democrats
Bryant and Stratton College alumni